Murder on the Second Floor is a 1932 British thriller film directed by William C. McGann and starring Pat Paterson, John Longden and Sydney Fairbrother. The screenplay concerns a novelist who imagines the murders of his fellow boarding-house tenants. It was based on a play of the same name by Frank Vosper. Warner Brothers later remade it in Hollywood as Shadows on the Stairs (1941).

Cast
John Longden as Hugh Bromilow
Pat Paterson as Sylvia Armitage
Sydney Fairbrother as Miss Snell
Ben Field as Mr. Armitage
Florence Desmond as Lucy
Franklyn Bellamy as Joseph Reynolds
John Turnbull as Inspector

References

External links

1932 films
British mystery thriller films
1930s crime thriller films
British detective films
1930s English-language films
British black-and-white films
1930s mystery thriller films
Films set in London
Films directed by William C. McGann
1930s British films